PACOM may refer to:

 United States Pacific Command
 Pan-African Congress of Mathematicians